The Californian Stakes is an American Thoroughbred horse race run annually in late April at Santa Anita Park in Arcadia, California (relocated from the now closed Hollywood Park Racetrack in Inglewood, California). The Grade II event is open to horses age three and up willing to race one and one-eighth miles (9 furlongs) on the dirt.  This race serves as a key prep to the Hollywood Gold Cup.

Inaugurated in 1954, winner Imbros set a new track record of 1:41.00 which also equaled the then world record for a mile and sixteenth on dirt.

Since inception the race has been contested at three different distances:
  miles (8.5 furlongs) : 1954-1979
  miles (9 furlongs)1980-1984, 1987–present
 1 mile (8 furlongs) : 1985-1986

Records
Speed record: (at current distance of  miles )
 1:47.06 - Heatseeker (new stakes and track record)

Most wins:
 2 - Cougar II (1971, 1972)
 2 - Quack (1973, 1974)
 2 - Ancient Title (1975, 1976)
 2 - Clubhouse Ride (2013, 2014)

Most wins by a jockey:
 5 - Bill Shoemaker (1957, 1971, 1972, 1980, 1983)
 5 - Laffit Pincay, Jr. (1975, 1977, 1979, 1982, 1985)
 5 - Chris McCarron (1986, 1988, 1989, 1998, 1999)

Most wins by a trainer:
 11 - Charlie Whittingham (1956, 1957, 1971, 1972, 1973, 1974, 1982, 1983, 1985, 1987, 1990)

Most wins by an owner:
 3 - Mary Jones Bradley (1971, 1972, 1985)

Winners

References
 The 2009 Californian Stakes at the NTRA

Horse races in California
Santa Anita Park
Graded stakes races in the United States
Open mile category horse races
Recurring sporting events established in 1954
1954 establishments in California